This is a list of notable burials at Oak Hill Cemetery, Northwest, Washington, D.C.

A
 Alice Acheson (1895–1996), painter
 Dean Acheson (1893–1971), Secretary of State under President Harry Truman
 Alvey A. Adee (1842–1924), assistant Secretary of State for 38 years
 John Adlum (1759–1836), pioneering viticulturalist, Revolutionary War soldier, judge
 Frederick Aiken (1832–1878), attorney for Lincoln assassination co-conspirator Mary Surratt
 Ethel Armes (1876–1945), journalist and author
 Conway Hillyer Arnold (1848–1917), rear admiral of the U.S. Navy

B
 Gamaliel Bailey (1807–1859), physician, abolitionist journalist, editor, publisher
 Marcellus Bailey (1840–1921), patent attorney who worked with Alexander Graham Bell
 Margaret Lucy Shands Bailey (1812–1888), anti-slavery writer,newspaper editor/publisher, poet, lyricist
 Theodorus Bailey (1805–1877), rear admiral of the U.S. Navy
 Spencer Fullerton Baird (1823–1887), founder of the Marine Biological Laboratory at Woods Hole, Massachusetts, and second secretary of the Smithsonian Institution
 George Ellis Baker (1816–1887), member of New York State Assembly
 Stephen Bloomer Balch (1747–1833), Presbyterian minister and educator
 Amzi L. Barber (1843–1909), pioneer of the asphalt industry
 Joseph Barnes (1817–1883), physician and U.S. Surgeon General of the U.S. Army
 Henry W. Barry (1840–1875), Brevet Brigadier General in the Union Army and Representative from Mississippi
 George Beall (1729–1807), landowner in Maryland and Georgetown
 Charles Milton Bell (1848–1893), portrait photographer known for his work with Native Americans
 Alice Birney (1858–1907), co-founder of the National Parent-Teacher Association
 William Birney (1819–1907), Union Army general, professor, lawyer, author
 Walker Blaine (1855–1890), assistant Secretary of State, solicitor of the Department of State
 James H. Blake (1768–1819), physician and mayor of Washington, D.C.
 Benjamin C. Bradlee (1921–2014), executive editor for The Washington Post
 Glenn Brenner (1948–1992), Washington, D.C., sportscasting legend
 Frederick H. Brooke (1876–1960), architect
 Alfred Hulse Brooks (1871–1924), geologist and namesake for Brooks Range in Alaska 
 Obadiah Bruen Brown (1779–1852), Baptist clergyman, chaplain of U.S. House of Representatives and Senate
 David K. E. Bruce (1898–1977), ambassador to France, Germany, and the United Kingdom
 Evangeline Bruce (1914–1995), society hostess and writer
 Charles Page Bryan, lawyer, politician, and diplomat
 Daniel Bryan,  politician, abolitionist, lawyer, poet, and postmaster
 Thomas Barbour Bryan, businessman, lawyer, and politician
 Wiley T. Buchanan Jr. (1913–1986), Chief of Protocol of the United States and U.S. Ambassador to Luxeumbourg and Austria

C
 Wilkinson Call (1834–1910), Senator from Florida
 Horace Capron (1804–1885), founder of Laurel, Maryland, Union Army officer, United States Commissioner of Agriculture
 Frances Carpenter (1890–1972), photographer and writer
 Samuel S. Carroll (1832–1893), U.S.Army general
 Samuel P. Carter (1819–1891), naval officer in American Civil  War, rear admiral in U.S. Navy
 Joseph Casey (1814–1879), Representative from Pennsylvania
 Sylvester Churchill (1783–1862), journalist and officer in the Regular Army
 Robert E. Clary (1805–1890), U.S. Army soldier in the Civil War
 Adolf Cluss (1825–1905), architect
 John H. C. Coffin (1815–1890), American astronomer and educator
 Henry D. Cooke (1825–1881), first territorial governor of the District of Columbia
 Thomas Corcoran, mayor of Georgetown, District of Columbia
 William Wilson Corcoran (1798–1888), banker and philanthropist
 Henry K. Craig (1791–1869), U.S. Army officer in Mexican-American War and Civil War
 Mary Mayo Crenshaw (1875–1951), civil servant and author
 Richard Cutts (1771–1845), Representative from Massachusetts, Comptroller of the Treasury

D
 Jean Margaret Davenport (1829–1903), actress; her married name was Lander
 F. Elwood Davis (1915–2012), lawyer and philanthropist
 Alexander de Bodisco (1786–1853), Russian Minister to the United States
 Sophie Radford de Meissner (1854–1857), author, socialite and spiritualist
 Josiah Dent (1817–1899), third president of the Board of Commissioners of the District of Columbia
 John Watkinson Douglass (1827–1909), president of the Board of Commissioners of the District of Columbia and Commissioner of Internal Revenue
 Lorenzo Dow (1777–1834), frontier minister and writer
 William M. Dunn (1814–1887), Representative from Indiana, Judge Advocate General of the U.S. Army
 Betty Duvall (1845–1891), Confederate spy

E
 Mary Henderson Eastman (1818–1887), historian and novelist who wrote about Native American life
 Seth Eastman (1808–1875), U.S. Army general, illustrator, painter
 John Eaton (1790–1856), Senator from Tennessee, Secretary of War
 Margaret "Peggy" Eaton (1899–1879), wife of John Eaton, confidant of Andrew Jackson and subject of Petticoat Affair
 Campbell Dallas Emory (1839–1878), U.S. military officer, served as aide de camp of Major General George Meade during the American Civil War
 Lydia S. English (1802–1866), founder of Georgetown Female Seminary
 George Eustis Jr. (1828–1872), Representative from Louisiana
 William Corcoran Eustis (1862–1921), U.S. Army captain, personal assistant to General John J. Pershing during World War I

F
 David E. Finley Jr. (1890–1977), director of National Gallery of Art, led the Roberts Commission
 Antonia Willard Ford (1838–1871), Confederate spy
 Uriah Forrest (1746–1805), Continental Congressman and Representative from Maryland
 Judith Ellen Foster (1840–1910), American lecturer, temperance worker and lawyer
 Thomas J. D. Fuller (1808–1876), Representative from Maine
 Jacob Fussell (1819–1912), American manufacturer

G
 John Garland (1793–1861), general in the Regular Army
 James Melville Gilliss (1811–1865), U.S. Navy officer, astronomer and founder of the United States Naval Observatory
 Charles C. Glover (1846–1936), banker and philanthropist
 Jane Cocking Glover (1789–1876), socialite and poet
 George Brown Goode (1851–1896), museum administrator at the Smithsonian Institution
 Arthur Pue Gorman (1839–1906), Senator from Maryland
 Arthur Pue Gorman Jr. (1873–1919), Maryland state senator
 Katharine Graham (1917–2001), president of The Washington Post
 Phil Graham (1915–1963), publisher and co-owner of The Washington Post
 Charles Griffin (1825–1867), Union general in the American Civil War

H
 Alexander Burton Hagner (1826–1915), Associate Justice of the Supreme Court of the District of Columbia
 Peter V. Hagner (1815–1893), U.S. Army officer
 William Wister Haines (1908–1989), author, screenwriter and playwright
 George E. Harris (1827–1911), U.S. Representative from Mississippi
 John Harris (1793–1864), U.S. Marine Corps colonel and sixth Commandant of the Marine Corps
 James P. Heath (1777–1854), Representative from Maryland
 John J. Hemphill (1849–1912), Representative from South Carolina
 Joseph Henry (1797–1878), first secretary of the Smithsonian Institution
 David Higgins (1789–1873), Ohio politician and judge
 Herman Hollerith (1860–1929), statistician and inventor
 Samuel Hooper (1808–1875), Representative from Massachusetts
 James Herron Hopkins (1831–1904), Representative from Pennsylvania
 George Horton (1859–1942), U.S. Consul General at Smyrna, writer
 Henry L. Howison (1837–1914), rear admiral of the U.S. Navy
 Sandy Hume (1969–1998), journalist for The Hill
 William H. Hunt (1823–1884), Secretary of the Navy

I
 Ebon C. Ingersoll (1831–1879), Representative from Illinois
 O.H. Irish (1830–1886), Chief, Bureau of Printing and Engraving, United States Department of the Treasury

J
 Thomas S. Jesup (1788–1860), Quartermaster General of the U.S. Army from 1818 to 1860
 Alice Johnson (1860–1914), Broadway actress and singer
 Nancy Johnson (1794–1890), inventor of the first Ice cream maker
 John A. Joyce (1842–1915), officer in the Union Army, poet and writer

K
 Beverley Kennon (1793–1844), officer in U.S. Navy
 Philip Barton Key (1757–1815), Representative from Maryland
 Philip Barton Key II (1818–1859), U.S. Attorney for the District of Columbia and murder victim
 John Jay Knox Jr. (1828–1892), Comptroller of the Currency, author of Coinage Act of 1873

L
 Tolbert Lanston (1844–1913), American inventor
 William S. Lincoln (1813–1893), Representative from New York

M
 Lily Mackall (1839–1861), Confederate spy
 William B. Magruder (1810–1869), physician and mayor of Washington City, District of Columbia
 Van H. Manning (1861–1932), director of U.S. Bureau of Mines
 William Marbury (1762–1835), one of the Midnight Judges appointed by President John Adams, plaintiff of Marbury v. Madison
 Alexander Macomb Mason (1841–1897), Confederate States Navy officer, explorer, diplomat
 Henry E. Maynadier (died 1868), U.S. Army officer known for the Raynolds Expedition and setting up peace talks with the Ogalala and Brulé tribes
 Marshall McDonald (1835–1895), commissioner of the United States Commission of Fish and Fisheries
 Gale W. McGee (1915–1992), Senator from Wyoming, U.S. Ambassador to the Organization of American States
 Henrietta McKenney (1825–1887), painter
 John E. McMahon (1860–1920), U.S. Army officer in World War I
 William McMurtrie (1851–1913), chemist who launched sugar beet industry 
 John R. McPherson (1833–1897), Senator from New Jersey
 Mary Virginia Merrick (1866–1955), Catholic social reformer
 Richard T. Merrick (1828–1885), lawyer
 William Matthews Merrick (1818–1889), judge and U.S. Representative from Maryland
 Myrtilla Miner (1815–1864), educator and abolitionist in Washington, D.C.
 Charles Eli Mix (1810–1878), commissioner of the Bureau of Indian Affairs
 Richard Mohun (1864–1915), explorer and diplomat
 George Washington Montgomery (1804–1841), writer, translator and diplomat
 John B. Montgomery (1794–1872), U.S. Navy officer during Mexican–American War and the American Civil War
 Charles Morris (1784–1856), Commodore, U.S. Navy, an officer from 1799 to 1847, during Quasi-War, First Barbary War, Second Barbary War and War of 1812

N
 Francis G. Newlands (1846–1917), Representative and Senator from Nevada, white supremacist
 John George Nicolay (1832–1901), private secretary to President Abraham Lincoln

O
 Herbert Gouverneur Ogden (1846–1906), geographer, topographer, cartographer
 Štefan Osuský (1889–1973), Slovak diplomat
 James F. Oyster (1851–1925), member of the D.C. Board of Commissioners

P
 William Tyler Page (1868–1942), public servant at U.S. Capitol, author of American Creed
 Edwin P. Parker Jr. (1891–1983), U.S. Army officer in World War II
 Carlile Pollock Patterson (1816–1881), fourth superintendent of the United States Coast Survey
 Jennie Byrd Bryan Payne (1857–1919), philanthropist, artist, and society figure
 John Barton Payne (1855–1935), politician, lawyer, and judge and United States Secretary of the Interior
 John Howard Payne (1791–1852), composer of "Home! Sweet Home!"
 Henry Pellew (1828–1923), 6th Viscount Exmouth
 Paul J. Pelz (1841–1918), architect of the Library of Congress
 Charles H. Percy (1919–2011), U.S. senator from Illinois and president of Bell & Howell
 George Peter (1779–1861), Representative from Maryland
 George Peter (1829–1893), Maryland politician, son of George Peter (1779–1861)
 Seth Ledyard Phelps (1824–1885), U.S. Navy officer, Minister to Peru, president of the DC Board of Commissioners
 Albert Pike (1809–1891), American attorney, Confederate officer, writer, and Freemason
 William Pinkney (1810–1883), fifth bishop of the Episcopal Diocese of Maryland
 Benjamin F. Pleasants (1795–1879), acting Solicitor of the U.S. Treasury
 Charles Pomeroy (1825–1891), Representative from Iowa
 John Pool (1826–1884), Senator from North Carolina
 Charles Henry Poor (1808–1882), rear admiral of the U.S. Navy
 Levin M. Powell (1798–1885), rear admiral of the U.S. Navy known for developing riverine warfare techniques
 Robert E. Preston (1836–1911), director of the United States Mint

R
 William Radford (1808–1890), Rear Admiral in the U.S. Navy
 George D. Ramsay (1802–1882), Chief of Ordnance of the U.S. Army
 Jesse L. Reno (1823–1862), U.S. Army officer from Virginia
 Zalmon Richards (1811–1899), Educator and first president of the National Education Association
 Benjamin F. Rice (1828–1905), U.S. senator from Arkansas
 William Adams Richardson (1821–1896), U.S. Secretary of the Treasury, chief justice of the U.S. Court of Claims
 John Rodgers (1812–1882), U.S. navy admiral
 William Ledyard Rodgers (1860–1944), U.S. Navy admiral, and naval and military historian
 George W. Roosevelt (1843–1907), Medal of Honor recipient in American Civil War
 Stephen Clegg Rowan (1808–1890), vice admiral of the U.S. Navy

S
 Gustavus H. Scott (1812–1882), United States Navy rear admiral (exhumed in 1896 and reburied at Arlington National Cemetery in Arlington, Virginia)
 Thomas Sewall (1786–1845), American physician known for getting convicted for body snatching
 Willis Shapley (1917–2005), NASA executive
 William Shubrick (1790–1874), rear admiral of the U.S. Navy
 Lorenzo Sitgreaves (1810–1888), U.S. Army officer who led Sitgreaves Expedition
 Walter T. Skallerup Jr. (1921–1987), lawyer who worked for the U.S. Department of Defense and as General Counsel of the Navy
 Howard K. Smith (1914–2002), CBS and ABC newscaster; war correspondent; film star
 Joseph Smith (1790–1877), United States Navy rear admiral
 Joseph B. Smith (1826–1862), United States Navy officer killed in action in the American Civil War
 E. D. E. N. Southworth (1819–1899), novelist
 Samuel Spencer (1847–1906), railroad executive
 Samuel Spencer (1910–1997), president of the Board of Commissioners of the District of Columbia
 Samuel Sprigg (c. 1783 – 1855), governor of Maryland
 Fabius Stanly (1815–1882), rear admiral of the U.S. Navy
 Edwin M. Stanton (1814–1869), Attorney General under President James Buchanan, Secretary of War under President Abraham Lincoln
 Hestor L. Stevens (1803–1864), Representative from Michigan
 Cornelius Stribling (1796–1880), United States Navy rear admiral, United States Naval Academy Superintendent
 Noah Haynes Swayne (1804–1884), Associate Justice of the Supreme Court of the United States

T
 Charles C. Tansill (1890–1964), professor of history and author
 Joseph Pannell Taylor (1796–1864), U.S. Army and Union Army general, brother of President Zachary Taylor
 Lorenzo Thomas (1804–1875), Adjutant General of the U.S. Army, acting Secretary of War under President Andrew Johnson
 Theodore Timby (1822–1909), inventor of the revolving turret first introduced on the Civil War ship USS Monitor, and many other inventions.
 Charles Henry Tompkins (1830–1915), brevet Brigadier General of the U.S. Army during the American Civil War. Recipient of the Medal of Honor.
 Robin Toner (1954–2008), journalist and New York Times political correspondent
 Nathan Towson (1784–1854), U.S. Army general in War of 1812 and Mexican-American War
 Charles R. Train (1879–1967), rear admiral of the U.S. Navy
 James True (1880–1946) Washington DC journalist
 James Noble Tyner (1826–1904), Representative from Indiana, Postmaster General under President Ulysses S. Grant

U
 Henry Ulke (1821–1910), portrait painter, photographer, entomologist; painted more than 100 portraits of high government officials
 Abel P. Upshur (1790–1844), Secretary of State and Secretary of the Navy under President John Tyler; originally buried at the Congressional Cemetery

V
 Cornelius P. Van Ness (1782–1852), governor of Vermont and diplomat to Spain
 John Peter Van Ness (1769–1846), U.S. Representative from New York and mayor of Washington, D.C.
 Marcia Van Ness (1782–1832), American socialite

W
 Robert J. Walker (1801–1869), Secretary of the Treasury, Senator from Mississippi
 Richard Wallach (1816–1881), mayor of the City of Washington, D.C.
 Howard Wall (1854–1909), professional baseball player
 George Corbin Washington (1789–1854), Representative from Maryland, grand-nephew of George Washington
 William Benning Webb (1825–1896), police superintendent and president of the Board of Commissioners of the District of Columbia
 Aristides Welch (1811–1890), race horse breeder
 Edward Douglass White (1844–1921), Associate Justice of the Supreme Court of the United States and Chief Justice of the United States
 John Brewer Wight (1853–1923), president of the Board of Commissioners of the District of Columbia
 Cadmus M. Wilcox (1824–1890), U.S. Army officer who served in the Mexican–American War; Confederate general during the American Civil War
 John A. Wilcox (1819–1864), U.S. Representative from Mississippi, Confederate Congress member
 Joseph Edward Willard (1865–1924), U.S. ambassador to Spain and Virginia politician
 William Orton Williams (1839–1863), Confederate officer during the American Civil War, executed as spy
 Gilbert C. Wiltse (1838–1893), naval officer in command at the 1893 Hawaiian Kingdom overthrow
 William W. W. Wood (1818–1882), engineer in the U.S. Navy
 Daniel Phineas Woodbury (1812–1864), U.S. soldier and energy; monument only
 Maxwell Van Zandt Woodhull (1843–1921), Union Army Officer during American Civil War
 Andrew Wylie (1814–1905), associate justice of the Supreme Court of the District of Columbia
 Robert H. Wyman (1822–1882), rear admiral in the U.S. Navy

Y
 Ammi B. Young (1798–1874), architect known for his Greek Revival and Neo-Renaissance styles
 David Levy Yulee (1810–1886), Senator from Florida, first Jew to serve in the U.S. Senate

Notes

References

External links
 Notable figures — Oak Hill Cemetery Historic Preservation Foundation
 Burial records — Oak Hill Cemetery Historic Preservation Foundation
 Oak Hill Cemetery at BillionGraves
 
 Oak Hill Cemetery at The Political Graveyard

 
Oak Hill Cemetery, Washington, DC
Washington, D.C.-related lists